Hitcham is a village and civil parish in Suffolk, England. Located on the B1115 road, between Hadleigh and Stowmarket, it is part of Babergh district. The parish contains the hamlets of Bird Street, Cook's Green and Cross Green. The population of the parish of Wattisham is also included.

Notable residents
 John Spring (?-1547), cloth merchant
 Edmund Rous (by 1521 – 1572 or later), landowner, magistrate, MP and Vice-Treasurer of Ireland
 Nicholas Clagett the Younger (1654–1727), clergyman, controversialist, and Archdeacon of Sudbury
 William Burkitt (1650-1703), biblical expositor and vicar and lecturer
 John Stevens Henslow (1796-1861), clergyman, botanist and geologist, best remembered as friend and mentor of Charles Darwin.
 Harry Graham (1905-1979), Anglican priest and Archdeacon of Richmond

References

External links

Village website

Villages in Suffolk
Civil parishes in Suffolk
Babergh District